is a Japanese former racing driver and team manager, most notable for competing for six years in Formula One. He participated in 97 Grands Prix, debuting on 1 March 1992. He scored a total of five championship points, all of them for the Tyrrell team in 1994. He also competed in the 1999 24 Hours of Le Mans, finishing 2nd overall and 1st in the GTP class. He currently serves as the team manager for Goodsmile Racing in Super GT's GT300 class.

Biography
Born in Tokyo, Katayama spent three years racing in France before returning home in 1988 to enter the Japanese F3000. He scored three podiums in 1990, and won the championship in 1991 with two wins and three second places.

Formula One
The car was unreliable and a distinct midfielder, with team-mate Bertrand Gachot getting the lion's share of the team's meagre resources. However, Katayama impressed by running in 5th at the Canadian GP until his engine blew, but was eventually left with a brace of 9th places as his best result.

 was to see a considerable turnaround for Tyrrell and Katayama. He impressed with the new 022, with three points-scoring finishes, a number of good qualifying performances, and generally being faster than his more experienced and acclaimed team-mate Mark Blundell. He was consistently a top-6 runner, but the car proved to be unreliable, leading him to 12 retirements, including the German GP, in which he was running 3rd before his throttle stuck open. However, in the four races that he did finish, he scored two 5th places, one 6th, and one 7th, good enough for 5 World Championship points.

After his 1994 performance, he was allegedly offered a contract with a top team for the 1995 season, but in Katayama's words, "he couldn't sign it". It would later emerge that in 1994 he had been diagnosed with cancer in his back; while non-threatening, it was painful, and his Grand Prix commitments delayed treatment. Katayama did not announce this until he retired from Formula One, not wanting anyone's sympathy to make excuses for him.

He stayed on with Tyrrell for the next two seasons, but suffered a loss of form, with two 7th places in high-attrition races his best results, thus scoring no points whilst being outpaced by rookie team-mate Mika Salo. At the 1996 Belgian Grand Prix he finished on the lead lap for the single time in his Formula One career. During these years he was highly disadvantaged by the regulation changes which led to higher cockpit sides, a response to the death of Ayrton Senna at the 1994 San Marino GP.

After leaving Tyrrell, his Mild Seven (another brand of Japan Tobacco) backing landed him a seat at Minardi, but they too were at a low ebb, and two 10th places were his best result. At his home Grand Prix, he emotionally announced his retirement from Formula One.

After Formula One

As a racing driver

Still popular in his homeland, Katayama has since dabbled in sportscars and GT racing, as well as his other love of mountaineering. One of his most notable performances post F1 was at the 1999 24 Hours of Le Mans, when during the last hour, as he was lapping traffic and closing up to the leading BMW in his Toyota GT-One, shared with compatriots Keiichi Tsuchiya and Toshio Suzuki, his car suffered a tyre blowout and, while he managed to keep the car on the track, he was forced to slowly make his way around the track to return to the pits for a new set. In the process the GT-One lost the chance to contend with the BMW. The lone GT-One would come home 2nd overall. Still, the GT-One won the GTP class, although it was the only car in that class to actually finish the race.

In 2008, he was one of several retired F1 drivers to compete in the new Speedcar Series.

As a team manager
In year 2000, Katayama established Team UKYO. The team originally participated in JGTC in 2001-2002 in the GT500 class in a collaboration with Cerumo, competing as the No. 33 team with Katayama and future team owner Masahiko Kondo as its drivers. The team left the series after the 2002 season before returning in 2011 to lead Goodsmile Racing's GT300 program. Katayama led the team to three GT300 titles in 2011, 2014, and 2017.

The team also took part in the Dakar Rally in 2002-2005 and 2007, as well as participating as a UCI Continental cycling team starting from 2012.

As a mountain climber
Katayama is a lover of mountain climbing. He has often been climbing mountains since his F1 era.

In 2001 he climbed the world's sixth-highest mountain, Cho Oyu.  On December 1, 2006, it was reported that he had achieved his lifetime ambition of climbing Manaslu, the eighth-highest mountain in the world, after an unsuccessful attempt in 2004.

On December 18, 2009, it was reported that he had been missing whilst climbing Mount Fuji with two friends. Upon calling a police search and rescue team, they informed the police that one of their climbing party had died, and another was presumed to be dying. Eventually, Katayama was found alive while two fellow climbers were found dead.

As of the end of 2010, Katayama had summited six of the Seven Summits: Mont Blanc (climbed in 1996), Kilimanjaro (1998), Elbrus (1998), Denali (2008), Aconcagua (2009), and Vinson Massif (2010)

Other sports
He has been participating other sporting events as an official invitee, such as Honolulu Marathon and Honolulu Century Ride. He has also started a cycling team called Team Ukyo.

Media appearances
He is now a commentator of Formula One in Japan, for Fuji TV. He also co-hosts the motoring program Samurai Wheels for NHK World.  In 1996 he was a guest judge on Iron Chef.

Helmet
Katayama's helmet was blue with a red and white stripe crossing the rear area and going in the sides forming an oblique letter T, and a vertical red and white stripe going across the top (until the visor).

Racing record

Career summary

Complete 24 Hours of Le Mans results

Complete Japanese Formula 3000 results
(key)

Complete International Formula 3000 results
(key) (Races in bold indicate pole position; races in italics indicate fastest lap.)

Complete Formula One results
(key)

† Katayama did not finish the race, but was classified as he completed more than 90% of the race distance.

Complete JGTC results
(key)

References

External links

 
 

1963 births
Living people
Japanese racing drivers
Japanese Formula One drivers
Larrousse Formula One drivers
Tyrrell Formula One drivers
Minardi Formula One drivers
Japanese Formula 3000 Championship drivers
Japanese Formula 3 Championship drivers
French Formula Three Championship drivers
24 Hours of Le Mans drivers
Off-road racing drivers
Japanese mountain climbers
People from Sagamihara
International Formula 3000 drivers
World Sportscar Championship drivers
Sports car racing team owners
Toyota Gazoo Racing drivers
Nismo drivers
TOM'S drivers
Kondō Racing drivers
Pescarolo Sport drivers